This List of California bouldering sites, includes locations within the state of California, United States, that are known for the rock climbing style of bouldering.

List of sites

vine.com

References

Bibliography
Fry, Craig. Southern California Bouldering Guide, Morris Book Publishing, 1995.

Citations and notes

California